Ludwig Rex (1 January 1888 – 29 September 1979) was a German film actor of the silent era. He appeared in 55 films between 1918 and 1927. He was born in Berlin, Germany and died in London.

Selected filmography

 Totenkopfreiter (1917) - Napoleon
 The Merry Wives of Windsor (1918) - Herr Reich
 Arno Starks Kraft (1918) - Arno Stark
 Der Fluch des Nuri (1918) - Nuri
 Nocturne of Love (1919)
 Die lachende Seele (1919)
 Der neue Herr Generaldirektor (1919)
 Homo sum (1919)
 Seelenverkäufer (1919) - Kapitän Brooks
 Die Geächteten (1919) - Wirt Petruk Czapka
 Um Diamanten und Frauen (1919) - Mr. Hunter
 Retter der Menschheit (1919) - Felsen
 Fluch der Vergangenheit (1919) - Bertram
 Der Glücksschmid (1919) - Tobias Möhring, Dorfschmied
 Luxuspflänzchen (1919)
 Die Teufelsgeige (1919)
 Die siebente Großmacht (1919)
 Der Tintenfischclub (1919)
 Gewalt gegen Recht (1920)
 The Song of the Puszta (1920)
 Blackmailed (1920) - Erpresser
 Angelo, das Mysterium des Schlosses Drachenegg (1920) - Alliwer
 The Cabinet of Dr. Caligari (1920) - Ein Mörder / A murderer (uncredited)
 The Dancer Barberina (1920) - Reeder Josuah Crichton
 The Eyes as the Accuser (1920)
 Gauner der Gesellschaft (1920) - Kommissar
 Die Strahlen des Todes (1920)
 Nirvana (1920, part 2–6)
 Die Sklavenhalter von Kansas-City (1920)
 Bar el Manach (1920)
 The Skull of Pharaoh's Daughter (1920)
 Marionetten des Teufels (1920)
 Die andere Welt (1920)
 The Black Guest (1920)
 Der Hund von Baskerville (1920, part 6)
 Der Flüchtling von Sing-Sing (1920)
 Tschetschensen-Rache (1921)
 The Conspiracy in Genoa (1921)
 Die Beichte einer Gefallenen (1921)
 Hands Up (1921)
 Night and No Morning (1921)
 Sons of the Night (1921, part 1, 2)
 The Terror of the Red Mill (1921) - Direktor Brighton
 The Shadow of Gaby Leed (1921)
 Deceiver of the People (1921)
 Fortunato (1921, part 1)
 Die verschwundene Million (1921, part 3)
 Women's Sacrifice (1922) - Verwalter
 Othello (1922)
 Der Fall Gembalsky (1922)
 Die Flibustier (1922) - Mr. Pierson
 Hallig Hooge (1923)
 Die Welt in Flammen (1923, part 1) - Generalstabschef Kerga
 Man by the Wayside (1923) - Aufseher
 Esterella (1923)
 The Beautiful Girl (1923) - Arzt
 Inge Larsen (1924)
 Slaves of Love (1924)
 The Third Watch (1924) - Gyttorps Sekretär
 Ein Traum ein Leben (1924) - Lucas von Lutovice
 Düstere Schatten, strahlendes Glück (1924) - Dr. West
 Ash Wednesday (1925)
 ...und es lockt ein Ruf aus sündiger Welt (1925) - Gottlieb Haberkorn
 Die Großstadt der Zukunft (1925)
 Die Beute (1925) - Henrik Bark
 The Clever Fox (1926)
 Die Welt ohne Waffen (1927) - Mitglied der Gesellschaft der Friedensfreunde
 The Long Intermission (1927) - Onkel Eduard

References

External links

1888 births
1979 deaths
German male film actors
German male silent film actors
Male actors from Berlin
20th-century German male actors